Antiotrema is a genus of flowering plants belonging to the family Boraginaceae.

Its native range is Southern China.

Species:

Antiotrema dunnianum

References

Boraginaceae
Boraginaceae genera
Taxa named by Heinrich von Handel-Mazzetti